Keratitis is a condition in which the eye's cornea, the clear dome on the front surface of the eye, becomes inflamed. The condition is often marked by moderate to intense pain and usually involves any of the following symptoms: pain, impaired eyesight, photophobia (light sensitivity), red eye and a 'gritty' sensation.

Classification (by chronicity)

Acute
 Acute epithelial keratitis
 Nummular keratitis
 Interstitial keratitis
 Disciform keratitis

Chronic
 Neurotrophic keratitis
 Mucous plaque keratitis

Classification (infective)

Viral

 Herpes simplex keratitis (dendritic keratitis). Viral infection of the cornea is often caused by the herpes simplex virus (HSV) which frequently leaves what is called a 'dendritic ulcer'.
 Herpes zoster keratitis, associated with herpes zoster ophthalmicus, which is a form of shingles.

Bacterial
 Bacterial keratitis. Bacterial infection of the cornea can follow from an injury or from wearing contact lenses. The bacteria involved are Staphylococcus aureus and for contact lens wearers, Pseudomonas aeruginosa. Pseudomonas aeruginosa contains enzymes that can digest the cornea.

Fungal
 Fungal keratitis, caused by Aspergillus fumigatus and Candida albicans (cf. Fusarium, causing an outbreak of keratitis in 2005–2006 through the possible vector of Bausch & Lomb ReNu with MoistureLoc contact lens solution)

Amoebic
 Acanthamoebic keratitis

 Amoebic infection of the cornea is a serious corneal infection, often affecting contact lens wearers. It is usually caused by Acanthamoeba. On May 25, 2007, the U.S. Center for Disease Control issued a health advisory due to increased risk of Acanthamoeba keratitis associated with use of Advanced Medical Optics Complete Moisture Plus Multi-Purpose eye solution.

Parasitic
 Onchocercal keratitis, which follows Onchocerca volvulus infection by infected blackfly bite. These blackfly, Simulium, usually dwell near fast-flowing African streams, so the disease is also called "river blindness".

Classification (by stage of disease)
 Superficial punctate keratitis
 Ulcerative keratitis

Classification (by environmental aetiology)
 Exposure keratitis (also known as exposure keratopathy) — due to dryness of the cornea caused by incomplete or inadequate eyelid closure (lagophthalmos).
 Photokeratitis — keratitis due to intense ultraviolet radiation exposure (e.g. snow blindness or welder's arc eye.)
 Contact lens acute red eye (CLARE) — a non-ulcerative sterile keratitis associated with colonization of Gram-negative bacteria on contact lenses.

Treatment
Treatment depends on the cause of the keratitis. Infectious keratitis can progress rapidly, and generally requires urgent antibacterial, antifungal, or antiviral therapy to eliminate the pathogen. Antibacterial solutions include levofloxacin, gatifloxacin, moxifloxacin, ofloxacin. It is unclear if steroid eye drops are useful or not.

In addition, contact lens wearers are typically advised to discontinue contact lens wear and replace contaminated contact lenses and contact lens cases. (Contaminated lenses and cases should not be discarded as cultures from these can be used to identify the pathogen).

Aciclovir is the mainstay of treatment for HSV keratitis and steroids should be avoided at all costs in this condition. Application of steroids to a dendritic ulcer caused by HSV will result in rapid and significant worsening of the ulcer to form an 'amoeboid' or 'geographic' ulcer, so named because of the ulcer's map like shape.

Prognosis
Some infections may scar the cornea to limit vision.  Others may result in perforation of the cornea, endophthalmitis (an infection inside the eye), or even loss of the eye.  With proper medical attention, infections can usually be successfully treated without long-term visual loss.

In non-humans
 Feline eosinophilic keratitis — affecting cats and horses; possibly initiated by feline herpesvirus 1 or other viral infection.

See also
 Chronic superficial keratitis, or pannus, for the disease in dogs
 Thygeson's superficial punctate keratopathy
 Keratoendotheliitis fugax hereditaria

References

External links 

 Facts About the Cornea and Corneal Disease The National Eye Institute (NEI)
 Filimentary keratitis

Inflammations
Disorders of sclera and cornea